Danny Dayton (born Daniel David Segall, November 20, 1923 – February 6, 1999) was an American actor and television director. Beginning in the 1950s, he played many roles in film and on TV.  He had a recurring role as Hank Pivnik on All in the Family and had guest roles in M*A*S*H, The Incredible Hulk, Charlie's Angels and The Love Boat.

Dayton graduated from the school of journalism at New York University, before turning to acting. In addition to acting, Dayton also directed episodes of Occasional Wife, Here's Lucy, and the short-lived series Good Morning World.

On February 6, 1999, Dayton died of emphysema in Los Angeles, California.

Filmography

References

External links

 
 
 

American male film actors
American male television actors
American television directors
Deaths from emphysema
Jewish American male actors
New York University alumni
Male actors from Jersey City, New Jersey
1923 births
1999 deaths
20th-century American male actors
Burials at Hillside Memorial Park Cemetery
20th-century American Jews